The Shawshank Redemption is a 1994 American drama film starring Tim Robbins and Morgan Freeman based on the Stephen King story.

The Shawshank Redemption may also refer to:

 The Shawshank Redemption (soundtrack), soundtrack to the 1994 film
 The Shawshank Redemption (play), a 2009 dramatic stageplay
 The Shawshank Redemption/Angola 3, a 2010 album by Bishop Lamont

See also

 Rita Hayworth and Shawshank Redemption, a Stephen King novella upon which the film is based
 Shawshank State Prison, a fictional prison created by Stephen King
 Shawshank tree, a white oak tree featured in the film